Sailor Beware! is a 1956 British comedy film directed by Gordon Parry and starring Peggy Mount, Shirley Eaton and Ronald Lewis. It was shot at Shepperton Studios with sets designed by the art director Norman G. Arnold. It was released in the United States by Distributors Corporation of America the following year as Panic in the Parlor .

The film is an adaptation of the successful stage play of the same name. It follows the story of a sailor betrothed to be married, but wary that home-life may echo that of her parents: a hen-pecked husband and battle-axe mother. It is one of Michael Caine's first films; he has a small, uncredited role as a sailor.

Plot
Royal Navy sailor, Albert Tufnell, is to marry Shirley Hornett the next day. He and his best man, fellow sailor Carnoustie Bligh, travel to the Hornett household.

However, Albert begins to have second thoughts when he spends the day with her family. He has no problem with her father, Henry, or with meek spinster, aunt Edie, but her domineering mother, Emma, is another matter entirely. (Meanwhile, Carnoustie and Shirley's beautiful cousin, Daphne Pink, are attracted to each other.) When Albert announces that he and Carnoustie are going to see their pals that night, Emma objects strenuously, as does Shirley, but they go anyway. Later, Emma sends Henry to fetch them, but it is they who have to bring back a thoroughly drunk Henry.

Edie lets slip plans for the couple to live in a house three doors away; plans made without consulting the bridegroom. Albert gives Shirley a chance to inform him, but she does not do so, which concerns him.

The day of the wedding, Albert does not appear at the church, so the Hornetts go home. Then, Albert shows up, as does the Reverend Purefoy, who was to preside over the ceremony. Albert states that he loves Shirley and wants to marry her. However, he has his doubts. Mr. Purefoy asks to speak to the couple privately. Everyone else leaves the room (but eavesdrops). Albert then explains that the unhappy example of her family life and the unilateral decision about where they were to live have made him hesitate. Henry comes in and surprisingly states that his wife has actually taken good care of him, and that he is fond of her. Upon hearing that, Emma breaks down and weeps; she tells Purefoy she wants to change her ways. Albert marries Shirley, but after they leave, Emma finds it hard to break old habits.

Cast
 Peggy Mount as Emma Hornett
 Shirley Eaton as Shirley Hornett
 Ronald Lewis as Albert Tufnell
 Cyril Smith as Henry Hornett
 Esma Cannon as Edie Hornett
 Gordon Jackson as Carnoustie Bligh
 Geoffrey Keen as the Rev. Purefoy
 Joy Webster as Daphne Pink
 Thora Hird as Mrs. Lack
 Eliot Makeham as Uncle Brummell
 Fred Griffiths as Taxi Driver
 Edie Martin as Little Woman in Church
 Margaret Moore as Little Girl
 Barbara Hicks as Little Girl's Mother
 George Rose as Waiter at Banfield's
 Frank Atkinson as Chauffeur (uncredited)
 Alfie Bass as Organist (uncredited)
 Richard Beynon as Bearded Sailor (uncredited)
 Douglas Blackwell as Co-op Man (uncredited)
 Anne Blake (uncredited)
 Michael Caine as Sailor (uncredited)
 Peter Collingwood as Verger (uncredited)
 George A. Cooper as Petty Officer (uncredited)
 Paul Eddington as Bearded Sailor (uncredited)
 Charles Houston (uncredited)
 Jack MacGowran as Toddy (uncredited)
 Henry McGee as Milkman (uncredited)
 John Pike as Bit Part (uncredited)
 Anthony Sagar as Naval Rating (uncredited)

Production
John Woolf bought the screen rights for $56,000. In late 1958 Woolf bought the rights to the sequel Hornet's Nest for $70,000 but it was not made.

Reception
The film was one of the ten most popular films at the British box office in 1956.

References

External links

1956 films
1956 romantic comedy films
British black-and-white films
British romantic comedy films
British films based on plays
Films directed by Gordon Parry
Films shot at Shepperton Studios
1950s English-language films
1950s British films